Girard Township is the name of some places in the U.S. state of Pennsylvania:
Girard Township, Clearfield County, Pennsylvania
Girard Township, Erie County, Pennsylvania

Pennsylvania township disambiguation pages